School of Environmental Studies may refer to:

School of Environmental Studies, Minnesota
School of Environmental Studies Delhi University
Yale School of Forestry and Environmental Studies
Queen's School of Environmental Studies, a unit at Queen's University in Ontario, Canada
Indiana University School of Public and Environmental Affairs
Environmental Studies Concentration at Soka University of America beginning Fall 2008
University of Guelph Faculty of Environmental Sciences
University of Waterloo Faculty of Environment
York University Faculty of Environmental Studies